Zahi Ahmed (born 12 August 2001) is an Israeli footballer who plays as a Winger for Hapoel Acre from the Liga Leumit.

Career

Early career
Ahmed grew up in the youth department of Hapoel Mate Asher, FC Mi'ilya and Hapoel Acre. On August 29, 2019, Ahmed made his debut for Hapoel Acre senior team in a 3–3 draw against Maccabi Ahi Nazareth at the Acre Municipal Stadium as part of the Liga Leumit.

On August 6, 2020, in the 2020–21 season, Ahmed made his Toto Cup debut in a 0–1 loss to Hapoel Nof HaGalil at Green Stadium. On November 2, Ahmed scored his debut goal in the Liga Leumit in a 2–0 victory over Hapoel Afula at the Acre Municipal Stadium. On February 21, 2021, Ahmed made his debut as part of the Israel State Cup in a 0–2 loss to Beitar Jerusalem at the Acre Municipal Stadium.

On August 5, the 2021–22 season, Ahmed scored his first goal in the Toto Cup in a 1–4 loss to Hapoel Umm al-Fahm at the Acre Municipal Stadium.  On October 26, Ahmed scored his debut goal as part of the Israel State Cup in a 1–0 victory over Hapoel Ramat HaSharon at the Acre Municipal Stadium.

Hapoel Be'er Sheva
On January 31, 2023, Ahmed signed a four-year contract with Hapoel Be'er Sheva of the Israeli Premier League and will join the club from the 2023–24 season.

Career statistics

References

External links
Zahi Ahmed at SoccerWay
Zahi Ahmed at Israel Football Association
Zahi Ahmed at Israel Football Association (Hebrew)

2001 births
Living people
Israeli footballers
Hapoel Acre F.C. players
Liga Leumit players